Djamel Belkacem (born 13 December 1958) is a Tunisian football manager who is the current manager of Saudi club Al-Orobah.

Honours

Manager
Al-Ansar
 Saudi First Division runner-up: 2010–11 

Al-Orobah
 Saudi First Division: 2012–13

Al-Qadsiah
 Saudi First Division: 2014–15

Al-Ettifaq
 Saudi First Division: 2015–16

Al-Wehda
 MS League: 2017–18

References

1958 births
Living people
Tunisian football managers
Ohod Club managers
Al-Riyadh SC managers
Al-Qadisiyah FC managers
Ettifaq FC managers
Al-Wehda Club (Mecca) managers
Al-Ta'ee managers
Tunisian expatriate football managers
Expatriate football managers in Saudi Arabia
Tunisian expatriate sportspeople in Saudi Arabia
Saudi First Division League managers
Saudi Professional League managers